Chris Bailey (born March 26, 1962) is an American animator and film director.

Early life and career
Bailey was born in Portland, Oregon on March 26, 1962.

He went to high school at Reynolds High School, and later attended California Institute of the Arts.
He worked at Disney as an animator for The Great Mouse Detective (1986) Sport Goofy in Soccermania (1987), Oliver & Company (1988), The Little Mermaid (1989), The Rescuers Down Under (1990), The Lion King (1994), and Hercules (1997). He also animated the children for the World Chorus post-show area for It's a Small World at Disneyland Paris.

Prior to Disney, Bailey worked with Don Bluth on the Space Ace and Dragon's Lair video games and also on Starchaser: The Legend of Orin. He became one of the first traditional animators to adapt to computer graphics.

He directed the animation for Paula Abdul's Opposites Attract music video, the 1995 Mickey Mouse cartoon, Runaway Brain, which was screened out of competition at the 1996 Cannes Film Festival, the 3D theme park attraction It's Tough to Be a Bug! located at Disney's Animal Kingdom and Disney California Adventure, and the television series Kim Possible.

He served as animation director for Garfield: The Movie, Garfield: A Tail of Two Kitties, Alvin and the Chipmunks, and 2 Stupid Dogs, supervising producer and supervising director for Clerks: The Animated Series and animation supervisor for Inspector Gadget, Mighty Joe Young, Fat Albert and X2.

Major Damage, Bailey's animated short, was posted on his YouTube channel on October 28, 2016. Back in 2001, Major Damage was a groundbreaking achievement because of his use of the Internet to collaborate with other artists and contributors.

Selected filmography

As director
 Runaway Brain (1995)
 It's Tough to Be a Bug! (1998)
 Clerks: The Animated Series (TV Series, six episodes, 2000–2001)
 Major Damage (2001)
 Kim Possible (TV Series, ten episodes, 2002–2005)
 Lady D (2008)
 Lefty (2008)
 Georgy (2008)
 Sean (2008)
 Judy M.D.: Super Surgeon (2008)
 Phil's Dance Party (2012)
 Paws of Fury: The Legend of Hank (2022) (co-director)

As animator
 Starchaser: The Legend of Orin (1985) (computer animation planner, assistant animator)
 The Great Mouse Detective (1986) (character animator, uncredited)
 Sport Goofy in Soccermania (1987) (animator)
 Technological Threat (1988) (character animator)
 Oliver & Company (1988) (character animator)
 Bugs Bunny's Wild World of Sports (TV 1989) 
 The Little Mermaid (1989) (character animator)
 The Rescuers Down Under (1990) (character animator)
 Dragon's Lair II (1991) (animator)
 Hocus Pocus (1993) (Cat animation supervisor)
 The Lion King (1994) (additional animator)
 Hercules (1997) (animator: "Nessus")
 Garfield: The Movie (2004) (animation supervisor) 
 Garfield: A Tail of Two Kitties (2006) (animation supervisor)
 Alvin and the Chipmunks (2007) (animation director)
 Alvin and the Chipmunks: The Squeakquel (2009) (animation director)
 Hop (2011) (senior animation supervisor)
 Tom and Jerry in New York (TV Series, animation supervisor, 2021–present)

As producer
 Scooby-Doo and Guess Who? (TV Series, 2019–2021)

Awards and nominations
 1996 Oscar nomination, Academy Award for Best Animated Short Film for Runaway Brain (1995)
 2005 Daytime Emmy Award nomination, Outstanding Children's Animated Program for Kim Possible (2005)

References

External links
Official website
Official blog (Last updated: June 6, 2011)
Major Damage on YouTube

Animators from Oregon
California Institute of the Arts alumni
Walt Disney Animation Studios people
Living people
American film directors
American animated film directors
American storyboard artists
American voice directors
1962 births
Artists from Portland, Oregon